Zvyagino is the name of several rural localities in Russia:
Zvyagino, Chulkovsky Selsoviet, Vachsky District, Nizhny Novgorod Oblast, a hamlet in Chulkovsky Selsoviet, Vachsky District, Nizhny Novgorod Oblast
Zvyagino, Kazakovsky Selsoviet, Vachsky District, Nizhny Novgorod Oblast, a hamlet in Kazakovsky Selsoviet, Vachsky District, Nizhny Novgorod Oblast
Zvyagino, Voskresensky District, Nizhny Novgorod Oblast, a hamlet in Voskresensky District, Nizhny Novgorod Oblast

See also
Zvyagin